The Bayer designation γ Normae, which is Latinized as gamma Normae and abbreviated γ Nor, is shared by two stars in the southern constellation of Norma:
γ¹ Normae, an F9 supergiant
γ² Normae, a G8 giant
The pair form a double star that can be resolved with the naked eye.

References

Normae, Gamma
Norma (constellation)